A prosecutor is a legal representative of the prosecution in states with either the common law adversarial system or the civil law inquisitorial system. The prosecution is the legal party responsible for presenting the case in a criminal trial against an individual accused of breaking the law. Typically, the prosecutor represents the state or the government in the case brought against the accused person.

Prosecutor as a legal professional 
Prosecutors are typically lawyers who possess a law degree, and are recognised as suitable legal professionals by the court in which they are acting. This may mean they have been admitted to the bar, or obtained a comparable qualification where available - such as solicitor advocates in England and Wales.

They become involved in a criminal case once a suspect has been identified and charges need to be filed. They are employed by an office of the government, with safeguards in place to ensure such an office can successfully pursue the prosecution of government officials. Multiple offices exist in a single country, especially in those countries with federal governments where sovereignty has been bifurcated or devolved in some way.

Since prosecutors are backed by the power of the state, they are subject to special professional responsibility rules in addition to those binding all lawyers. For example, in the United States, Rule 3.8 of the ABA Model Rules of Professional Conduct requires prosecutors to "make timely disclosure to the defense of all evidence or information that tends to negate the guilt of the accused or mitigates the offense." Not all U.S. states adopt the model rules; however, U.S. Supreme Court cases and other appellate cases have ruled that such disclosure is required. Typical sources of ethical requirements imposed on prosecutors come from appellate court opinions, state or federal court rules, and state or federal statutes (codified laws).

Directors of public prosecutions
In Australia, Canada, England and Wales, Kenya, Hong Kong, Northern Ireland, Republic of Ireland, Trinidad and Tobago, Guyana, Kenya, and South Africa, the head of the prosecuting authority is known as the director of public prosecutions (DPP) and is appointed, not elected. A DPP may be subject to varying degrees of control by the attorney general, a formal written directive which must be published.

In Australia, the Offices of the Director of Public Prosecutions institute prosecutions for indictable offences on behalf of the Crown. At least in the case of very serious matters, the DPP will be asked by the police, during the course of the investigation, to advise them on sufficiency of evidence, and may well be asked to prepare an application to the relevant court for search, listening device or telecommunications interception warrants.

More recent constitutions, such as South Africa's, tend to guarantee the independence and impartiality of the DPP.

Common law jurisdictions

Australia
Prosecutors in Australia come in a few distinct species. Prosecutors of minor criminal cases in lower courts are Police Sergeants with a traineeship in prosecution and advocacy lasting approximately 1 year in duration, although they may hold law degrees. Crown Prosecutors are always lawyers, and typically barristers, and they represent the State or Commonwealth in serious criminal cases in higher courts, County Court and above. Aside from Police prosecutors and Crown prosecutors, government agencies have the authority to appoint non-lawyers to prosecute on their behalf, such as the RSPCA Inspectors.

Canada
In Canada, public prosecutors in most provinces are called Crown Attorney or Crown Counsel. They are generally appointed by the provincial Attorney-General.

England and Wales 
The prosecution landscape in England and Wales is highly varied, meaning that a 'prosecutor' can refer to a number of different individuals and roles.

Types of prosecutor 
The primary prosecutor in the jurisdiction is the Crown Prosecution Service (CPS) which is led by the Director of Public Prosecutions (DPP). The CPS prosecutes on behalf of the Crown and also takes forward prosecutions originating from police investigations. While the DPP must be a suitably qualified lawyer under s71 Courts and Legal Services Act 1990, the DPP does not take on cases themselves and instead plays an administrative and leadership role. In this way, while the DPP may be referred to as a 'prosecutor' the individual in the role would not take any cases to court. The DPP is appointed by the Attorney General and the Attorney General also has a supervisory authority as the 'sponsor' of the CPS, however, the CPS is an independent body and the Attorney General cannot direct particular prosecutions. Unlike in the United States of America and other jurisdictions, the Attorney General is not a prosecutor in England and Wales. Rather, the role is a political office of the chief legal advisor to the executive. 

Crown Prosecutors are lawyers who work for the CPS. They are responsible for researching, advising police investigations, preparing cases for trial and sometimes presenting the case at trial. These lawyers may also be referred to as 'prosecutors'. A number of other bodies have authority to bring prosecutions in England and Wales include the Serious Fraud Office (SFO), Service Prosecuting Authority and Financial Conduct Authority (FCA). These organisations and their legal representatives may be called 'prosecutors.' This is the same for any person, organisation or their representatives during a private prosecution. 

Finally, when cases are brought to trial a barrister, or solicitor with higher rights of audience, may present the case before a magistrate, judge or jury. In these instances, referring to the 'prosecutor' would refer to the lawyer conducting the case during trial. In most serious offences, the CPS or other prosecuting authority will instruct a barrister to represent them. In the most serious cases this may be a King's Counsel, and barristers may work in teams with a leader directing 'juniors'.  Unlike in the United States, these prosecuting barristers will work on a case-by-case basis and so may also engage in defence work - they will not be employed to solely undertake prosecution advocacy.

The approach of the CPS to prosecutions 
Crown Prosecutors are bound by a strict code of conduct, known as the Code for Crown Prosecutors, which governs how cases are charged and trials conducted. This fundamental code is supported by a range of other policies, most notably the DIrector's Guidance on Charging. The first stage in prosecuting a case is deciding to charge the suspect - it is this process which begins the prosecution. The CPS have authority to decide whether a person is charged in all offences, though the police may charge all summary offences, and either-way offences when there is an anticipated guilty plea and the nature of the offence is suitable for sentence in magistrates’ court. 

In order to charge the circumstances must meet the Full Code Test. In some urgent cases, a lower Threshold Test can be applied to get a charge quickly, but the Full Code Test must then be applied at the earliest opportunity. The Full Code Test has two stages, both parts are equal and must be met before a prosecution can be brought. 

The Threshold Test must be kept under proactive and continuous review, and should only be used in rare and urgent circumstances.

Prosecutions by other government agencies 
State investigative agencies such as the SFO and FCA, alongside independent prosecutors like the Service Prosecuting Authority, may all bring prosecutions themselves without using the CPS. Nevertheless, these prosecutors will follow the standards set by the Code of Crown Prosecutors alongside their own prosecution policies, which may deal with issues specific to the types of crime they engage with.
There may at times be a confusion as to which agency is responsible for having brought a prosecution. Which agency is prosecuting may effect whether an offence can be properly tried - as not all agencies can investigate and prosecute all offences. In R. v Stafford Justices ex parte Customs and Excise Commissioners (1991) 2 All ER 201 it was found by the court that a prosecution is instituted by the police only when they have investigated, arrested and brought the arrested person to the custody officer. A case is not instituted by the police simply because a custody officer at a police station charges the suspect. Applying the same principle, proceedings are instituted by another prosecuting agency when they have been solely responsible for the investigation and arrest of the suspect, even though the suspect is taken to the police station to be charged by a custody officer.

The CPS advise that a case should probably be conducted by another prosecuting authority if any of the following factors apply:

 the police did not conduct the majority of the investigation; 
 the police were only involved in overseeing a search, effecting an arrest or assisting other investigators in the conduct of an interview; 
 the other authority is in possession of all the main exhibits; 
 someone other than a police officer is named on the charge sheet as the person accepting the charge or as the officer in the case.

Prosecutions requiring special consent 
Prosecutions under certain acts require the consent of the Attorney General or DPP before they can proceed. In practice the following types of consent may be required:

The range of offences which require consent is wide, a list of the offences can be found at Annex 1 - Consents to Prosecute.

Private prosecutions 

In England and Wales there is a statutorily protected common law right for any person to institute a private prosecution. This right is retained by s6(1) Prosecution of Offenders Act 1985.  Some organisations regularly use private prosecutions on a large scale to achieve an institutional goal, for example the vast majority of prosecutions under the Animal Welfare Act 2006 are prosecuted by the Royal Society for the Prevention of Cruelty to Animals (RSPCA) as private prosecutions. The Post Office has also recently under taken a wide array of private prosecutions against post masters, leading to a subsequent scandal in which these prosecutions have widely come to be seen as a miscarriage of justice. The RSPCA have come under strong criticism for lacking sufficient independence to act as a prosecutor from the independent 'Wooler' review; the Environmental, Food and Rural Affairs Committee and the Justice Select Committee, given they also investigate the offences and campaign politically for animal rights.

The ongoing issues with private prosecutions outlined above has led to the Justice Select Committee calling for a closer examination of the process and regulation by government.

It is usually practically difficult for an individual to bring a private prosecution given the high cost - estimated by the Ministry of Justice at £8,500 on average. Even if a private prosecutor is not legally qualified, they must meet the usual legal requirements lawyers must undertake including the Criminal Procedure Rules and appropriate disclosure standards.

DPP's power to take over private prosecutions 
The DPP has authority to take over any prosecution instituted by another person or organisation, and to discontinue the prosecution if they see fit. The CPS have set out public guidance on when they will take over a prosecution, this indicates that the CPS should take over and continue with the prosecution if the papers clearly show all of the following:

 the evidential sufficiency stage of the Full Code Test is met; and
 the public interest stage of the Full Code Test is met; and
 there is a particular need for the CPS to take over the prosecution.

The final consideration is designed to cover the situation where, for whatever reason, the investigative authorities with which the CPS usually deals have not brought the case to the CPS' attention and yet it is a case that merits the prosecution being conducted by a public prosecuting authority rather than by a private individual.

New Zealand
In New Zealand, most crimes are prosecuted by a Police Prosecutor, an employee of the New Zealand Police. The most serious crimes - about 5% of all crimes - is outsourced to a lawyer working at private law firm known as a Crown prosecutor.

Scotland
Though Scots law is a mixed system, its civil law jurisdiction indicates its civil law heritage. Here, all prosecutions are carried out by Procurators Fiscal and Advocates Depute on behalf of the Lord Advocate, and, in theory, they can direct investigations by the police. In very serious cases, a Procurator Fiscal, Advocate Depute or even the Lord Advocate, may take charge of a police investigation. It is at the discretion of the Procurator Fiscal, Advocate Depute, or Lord Advocate to take a prosecution to court, and to decide on whether or not to prosecute it under solemn procedure or summary procedure. Other remedies are open to a prosecutor in Scotland, including fiscal fines and non-court based interventions, such as rehabilitation and social work. All prosecutions are handled within the Crown Office and Procurator Fiscal Service. Procurators fiscal will usually refer cases involving minors to Children's Hearings, which are not courts of law, but a panel of lay members empowered to act in the interests of the child.

United States
The United States is the only country in the world where citizens elect prosecutors.

The director of a prosecution office is known by any of several names depending on the jurisdiction, most commonly district attorney. Other names include state's attorney, state attorney, county attorney, and commonwealth's attorney.

The prosecution is the legal party responsible for presenting the case against an individual or a corporation suspected of breaking the law, initiating and directing further criminal investigations, guiding and recommending the sentencing of offenders, and are the only attorneys allowed to participate in grand jury proceedings.

The titles of prosecutors in state courts vary from state to state and level of government (i.e. city, county, and state) and include the terms District Attorney in New York, California, Texas, Pennsylvania, Delaware, Massachusetts, North Carolina, Georgia, Nevada, Wisconsin, Oregon, and Oklahoma;  City Attorney in California cities (typically prosecute only minor and misdemeanor offenses) Commonwealth's Attorney in Kentucky and Virginia; County Attorney in Nebraska, Minnesota, and Arizona; County Prosecutor in New Jersey, Ohio, and Indiana; District Attorney General in Tennessee; Prosecuting Attorney in Arkansas, Hawaii, Idaho, Michigan, Washington, and West Virginia (as well as in Missouri where cities additionally use  "City Attorneys" to prosecute on their behalf); State's Attorney in Connecticut, Florida, Illinois, Maryland, North Dakota, and Vermont; State Prosecutor; Attorney General in Delaware and Rhode Island; and Solicitor in South Carolina. Prosecutors are most often chosen through local elections, and typically hire other attorneys as deputies or assistants to conduct most of the actual work of the office. United States Attorneys are appointed by the President and confirmed by the Senate. They represent the federal government in federal court in both civil and criminal cases. Private attorneys general can bring criminal cases on behalf of private parties in some states.

Prosecutors are required by state and federal laws to follow certain rules. For example, the government must disclose exculpatory evidence to the defense; must disclose matters affecting the credibility of prosecution witnesses, such as an agreement to dismiss the witness's own charges in exchange for their testimony; must not destroy potentially useful evidence in bad faith; and must not use false testimony to secure a conviction. Failure to follow these rules may result in a finding of prosecutorial misconduct, although a 2013 investigation found that actual discipline for prosecutorial misconduct was lacking.

Prosecutors are also tasked with seeking justice in their prosecutions. "The United States Attorney," explained the U.S. Supreme Court, is the representative not of an ordinary party to a controversy, but of a sovereignty whose obligation to govern impartially is as compelling as its obligation to govern at all, and whose interest, therefore, in a criminal prosecution is not that it shall win a case, but that justice shall be done. As such, he is in a peculiar and very definite sense the servant of the law, the two-fold aim of which is that guilt shall not escape or innocence suffer. He may prosecute with earnestness and vigor—indeed, he should do so. But, while he may strike hard blows, he is not at liberty to strike foul ones. It is as much his duty to refrain from improper methods calculated to produce a wrongful conviction as it is to use every legitimate means to bring about a just one.

Prosecutors in some jurisdictions have the discretion to not pursue criminal charges, even when there is probable cause, if they determine that there is no reasonable likelihood of conviction. Prosecutors may dismiss charges in this situation by seeking a voluntary dismissal or nolle prosequi.

In Kentucky, Massachusetts, Pennsylvania, and Virginia, criminal prosecutions are brought in the name of the Commonwealth.  In California, Colorado, Illinois, Michigan, and New York, criminal prosecutions are brought in the name of the People.  In the remaining states, criminal prosecutions are brought in the name of the State.

Civil law jurisdictions 
Prosecutors are typically civil servants who possess a university degree in law and additional training in the administration of justice. In some countries, such as France and Italy, they are classed as judges.

Belgium 
In Belgium, the Senior Crown prosecutor (Procureur du Roi/Procureur des Konings in trial courts and Procureur Général/Procureur-Generaal in appellate courts) is supported by subordinate Crown prosecutors (substituts/substituten). They open preliminary investigations and can hold a suspect in custody for up to 48 hours. When necessary, a Crown prosecutor will request an examining judge (juge d'instruction/onderzoeksrechter) be appointed to lead a judicial inquest. With a judge investigating, Crown prosecutors do not conduct the interrogatories, but simply lay out the scope of the crimes which the judge and law enforcement forces investigate (la saisine). Like defense counsel, Crown prosecutors can request or suggest further investigation be carried out. 
The Crown prosecutor is in charge of policy decisions and may prioritize cases and procedures as need be.

During a criminal trial, prosecutors must introduce and explain the case to the trier of fact, i.e., judges or jury. They generally suggest a reasonable sentence which the court is not obligated to follow; the court may decide on a tougher or softer sentence.

Crown prosecutors also have a number of administrative duties.  They may advise the court during civil actions.

Under Belgian law, judges and prosecutors are judicial officers with equal rank and pay.

The Minister of Justice can order a criminal investigation but cannot prevent one (droit d'injonction positive/positief injunctierecht).

Brazil 

In Brazil, the public prosecutors form a body of autonomous civil servants—the Public Ministry (Ministério Público)—working both at the federal and state level.

Members of the Federal Prosecution Service are divided in three ranks, according to the jurisdiction of the courts before which they officiate. 	
Federal Prosecutors (Procuradores da República) officiate before single judges and lower courts, Federal Circuit Prosecutors (procuradores regionais da República) before federal appellate courts, and Associate Federal Prosecutors General (subprocuradores gerais da República) before superior federal courts. The Prosecutor General of the Republic (Procurador Geral da República) heads the federal body, and tries cases before the Brazilian Supreme Court.

At the state level, the career is usually divided in state prosecutors (promotores de Justiça) who practice before the lower courts and state apellate prosecutors (procuradores de Justiça) who practice before the state courts of appeals. There are also military prosecutors whose career, although linked to the federal prosecutors, is divided in a manner similar to state prosecutors.

In Brazil the prosecutors' main job is to promote justice, as such they have the duty of not only trying criminal cases, but, if during the trial, they become convinced of a defendant's innocence,  requesting the judge to acquit him. The prosecutor's office has always the last word on whether criminal offenses will or will not be charged, with the exception of those rare cases in which Brazilian law allows for private prosecution. In such cases, the prosecutor will officiate as custos legis, being responsible to ensure that justice is indeed carried out.

Although empowered by law to do so, prosecutors conduct criminal investigations only in major cases, usually involving police or public officials' wrongdoings. Also, they are in charge of external control over police activity and requesting the initiation of a police investigation.

The power of individual prosecutors to hold criminal investigations was controversial and, although massively supported by judges, prosecutors and the general population, it was contested before the Supremo Tribunal Federal, but in 2015, this Court decided favorably to its power (RGE n. 593.727-MG).

According to a 2012 law, the chief of police (delegado de polícia), as the police authority, is responsible for conducting the criminal investigation in Brazil by means of a police investigation (inquérito policial) or other procedure provided by law that has the purpose of ascertaining the circumstances, materiality, and authorship of criminal offenses. Similar provisions are found in the Code of Criminal Procedure and in article 144 of the federal constitution.

Beside their criminal duties, Brazilian prosecutors are among those authorized by the Brazilian constitution to bring action against private individuals, commercial enterprises, and the federal, state and municipal governments, in the defense of minorities, the environment, consumers, and the civil society in general.

France 

In France, the Office of the Prosecutor includes a Chief Prosecutor (Procureur de la République in trial courts and procureur général in appellate courts or the Supreme Court) and his deputies and assistants (avocats généraux and substituts). The Chief Prosecutor generally initiates preliminary investigations and, if necessary, asks that an examining judge (juge d'instruction) be assigned to lead a formal judicial investigation. When an investigation is led by a judge, the prosecutor plays a supervisory role, defining the scope of the crimes being examined by the judge and law enforcement forces. Like defense counsel, the chief prosecutor may petition or move for further investigation. During criminal proceedings, prosecutors are responsible for presenting the case at trial to either the bench or the jury. Prosecutors generally suggest advisory sentencing guidelines, but the sentence remains at the court's discretion to decide, to increase or reduce as it sees fit. In addition, prosecutors have several administrative duties.

Prosecutors are considered magistrates under French law, as in most civil law countries. While the defense and the plaintiff are both represented by common lawyers, who sit (on chairs) on the courtroom floor, the prosecutor sits on a platform as the judge does, although he doesn't participate in deliberation. Judges and prosecutors are trained at the same school, and regard one other as colleagues.

Germany 
In Germany, the Staatsanwalt ("state attorney") is a life-tenured public official in the senior judicial service belonging to the same corps as judges. The Staatsanwalt heads pre-trial criminal investigations, decides whether to press a charge or drop it, and represents the government in criminal courts. The Staatsanwalt not only has the "professional responsibility" not to withhold exculpatory information, but is also required by law to actively determine such circumstances and to make them available to the defendant or the defense attorney. If the Staatsanwalt is not convinced of the defendant's guilt, the state attorney is required to plead against or in favor of the defendant according to the prosecutor's own assessment. Prosecution is compulsory if the prosecutor has sufficient evidence to convict.

Italy 
In Italy, a Prosecutor's Office is composed of a Chief Prosecutor (procuratore capo) assisted by deputies (procuratori aggiunti) and assistants (sostituti procuratori). Prosecutors in Italy are judicial officers just like judges and are ceremonially referred to as Pubblico Ministero ("Public Ministry" or P.M.).

Italian Prosecutors officiate as custos legis, being responsible to ensure that justice is indeed carried out. They are obligated under the Constitution to initiate preliminary investigations once they are informed or take personal notice of a criminal act—notitia criminis—or receive a bill of complaint. They can direct investigations or conduct them through orders and directives given to (judicial) police detectives, who can make their own parallel investigations in coordination with the Prosecutor. If enough evidence has been gathered in order to proceed, the prosecution is compulsory and it must move from preliminary investigations to initiate trial proceedings. At trial, the prosecuting attorney has to handle the prosecution but has an overarching duty to promote justice. In practice, this duty means that prosecutors are prohibited from withholding exculpatory evidence and must request that the judge acquit the defendant if, during the trial, the prosecutor becomes convinced of the defendant's innocence, or agrees that there is no evidence that proves his guilt beyond any reasonable doubt.

In appellate courts, the Office of the Prosecutor is called Procura Generale and the Chief Prosecutor the Procuratore Generale (PG). The Procuratore Generale presso la Corte di Cassazione is the Chief General Prosecutor before the Corte di Cassazione, the Supreme Court of Italy.

Prosecutors are allowed during their career to act in the other's stead, but a recent ruling by the Italian Constitutional Court stated that prosecutors, who wish to become judges, must relocate to another region and are prohibited to sit or hear trials that they themselves initiated.

Japan 

In Japan,  are professional officials who have considerable powers of investigation, prosecution, superintendence of criminal execution and so on. Prosecutors can direct police for investigation purposes, and sometimes investigate directly. Only prosecutors can prosecute criminals in principle, and prosecutors can decide whether to prosecute or not. High-ranking officials of the Ministry of Justice are largely prosecutors.

Poland
The highest-ranking prosecutor office of the Prokuratura in Poland is the Prokurator Generalny (General Prosecutor)—chief of the Prokuratura Krajowa (National Public Prosecutor's Office). The GP has 5 deputies. Structure of Public Prosecution in Poland is 4-level: 
Prokuratura Krajowa — National Public Prosecutor's Office --> prokuratury regionalne — provincial public prosecutor's offices (11) --> prokuratury okręgowe — regional public prosecutor's offices (45) --> prokuratury rejonowe — district public prosecutor's offices (358).
Apart from a brief period between 2010 and 2016, the position of Public Prosecutor General has been held concurrently by the Minister of Justice.

South Korea 
Prosecutors are public officials who are members of the Prosecutor's Office.

Prosecutors can conduct crime investigations directly or indirectly. They are responsible for the entire process of investigations and court prosecutions. Since Korean modern law was designed after civil law, the role of Korean prosecutors is similar or identical to that of European equivalents in commanding investigations, determining indictable cases and prosecuting process. A prosecutor has the power to prohibit a defendant or an accused individual from departing the Republic of Korea via an  "international hold".

Sweden
In Sweden, public prosecutors are lawyers who work out of the Swedish Prosecution Authority and direct police investigations of serious crimes. For all criminal cases, public prosecutors decide arrests and charges on behalf of the public and are the only public officers who can make such decisions.  Plaintiffs also have the option of hiring their own special prosecutor (enskilt åtal). The exception is cases concerning crimes against the freedom of the press for which the Chancellor of Justice acts as the prosecuting attorney. In court, the prosecutor is not necessarily in an adversarial relationship to the defendant, but is under an obligation to investigate and present information that may incriminate or exhonerate the defendant. The prosecutor is not a judicial officer, nor do they participate in the private deliberations of the court.

Public prosecutors are the only public officers who can decide to appeal cases to appellate courts. Otherwise, appeals are initiated by defense counsel, the plaintiff, their representatives, and other parties to the case (målsäganden). When a case has been decided by an appellate court, the right to appeal to the Supreme Court passes from the case's prosecutor to the Prosecutor-General.

Socialist law jurisdictions 

A Public Procurator is an office used in Socialist judicial systems which, in some ways, corresponds to that of a public prosecutor in other legal systems, but with more far-reaching responsibilities, such as handling investigations otherwise performed by branches of the police. Conversely, the policing systems in socialist countries, such as the Militsiya of the Soviet Union, were not aimed at fulfilling the same roles as police forces in Democratic countries.

People's Republic of China 

A Public Procurator is a position in the People's Republic of China, analogous to both detective and public prosecutor. Legally, they are bound by Public Procurators' Law of the People's Republic of China. According to Article 6, the functions and duties of public procurators are as follows:

Supervise the enforcement of laws according to law.
Public prosecution on behalf of the State.
Investigate criminal cases directly accepted by the People's Procuratorates as provided by law.
Other functions and duties as provided by law.

Vietnam

The Supreme People's Procuracy is the highest office of public procurators in Vietnam.

Institutional independence 

In many countries, the prosecutor's administration is directly subordinate to the executive branch (e.g., the US Attorney General is a member of the President's cabinet). In some other countries, such as Italy or Brazil, the prosecutors are judicial civil servants, so they have the same liberties and independence that judges traditionally enjoy.

In other countries, a form of private prosecution is available, meaning persons or private entities can directly petition the courts to hold trial against someone they feel is guilty of a crime, should the prosecutor refuse to indict.

Private prosecution

In the early history of England, victims of a crime and their family had the right to hire a private attorney to prosecute criminal charges against the person alleged to have injured the victim. In the 18th century, prosecution of almost all criminal offences in England was private, usually by the victim. In Colonial America, because of Dutch (and possibly French) practice and the expansion of the office of attorney general, public officials came to dominate the prosecution of crimes. However, privately funded prosecutors constituted a significant element of the state criminal justice system throughout the nineteenth century. The use of a private prosecutor was incorporated into the common law of Virginia, but is no longer permitted there. Private prosecutors were also used in North Carolina as late as 1975. Private prosecution has been used in Nigeria, but the practice is being phased out.

Bruce L. Benson's To Serve and Protect lauds the role of private prosecutors, often employed by prosecution associations, in serving the needs of crime victims in England. Libertarian theory holds that public prosecutors should not exist, but that crimes should instead be treated as civil torts. Murray Rothbard writes, "In a libertarian world, there would be no crimes against an ill-defined 'society,' and therefore no such person as a 'district attorney' who decides on a charge and then presses those charges against an alleged criminal."

See also
 Public procurator
 Public prosecutor's office
 Magistrats Européens pour la Démocratie et les Libertés (European Association of Judges and Public Prosecutors).

References

Bibliography
 Gad Barzilai. The Attorney General and the State Prosecutor: Is Institutional Separation Warranted? (Jerusalem: The Israel Democracy Institute, 2010). The Index of Arab-Jewish Relations in Israel 2012 (English)
 Hugo Nigro Mazzilli. Regime Juridico do Ministério Público, 5ª edição, São Paulo: Saraiva, 2001.
 Raoul Muhm, Gian Carlo Caselli (Hrsg.), Die Rolle des Staatsanwaltes Erfahrungen in Europa–Il ruolo del Pubblico Ministero Esperienze in Europa–Le role du Magistrat du Parquet Expériences en Europe–The role of the Public Prosecutor Experiences in Europe, Vecchiarelli Editore Manziana (Roma) 2005 
 Raoul Muhm, "The role of the Public Prosecutor in Germany" in The Irish Jurist, Volume XXXVIII, New Series 2003, The Law Faculty, University College, Dublin LARCHIVIO - Finance Journal
 Erick Maurel, Paroles de procureur (Paris: Gallimard, 2008),

External links

 Prosecutor.info indexes almost 2,900 prosecutor web sites throughout the US and other countries.
 ProsecutorTips.com Free trial advocacy tips for prosecutors and trial
 Burnley Law Firm Summaries of Recent U.S. Criminal Law Decisions
 CCPE Consultative Council of European Prosecutors
 L'Archivio  "diritto – history"
 IAP International Association of Prosecutors
 Private Prosecution in UK Edmonds Marshall McMahon Leading Private Prosecutors

 

Criminal law
Government occupations
Local government
Legal professions
Law enforcement